Two international geophysical societies offer awards each year which are named in honor of Maurice Ewing; these are the American Geophysical Union and the Society of Exploration Geophysicists:


AGU Ewing Medal

The Maurice Ewing Medal is awarded by the American Geophysical Union for "significant original contributions to the understanding of physical, geophysical, and geological processes in the ocean; to those who advance oceanographic engineering, technology, and instrumentation; and to those who perform outstanding service to the marine sciences". The award was instituted in 1974 and is jointly sponsored by the United States Navy.

Recipients (AGU)
Source: American Geophysical Union

SEG Ewing Medal

The Maurice Ewing Medal of the Society of Exploration Geophysicists is awarded to one who is “deserving of SEG’s highest honor through having made distinguished contributions both to the advancement of the science and to the profession of exploration geophysics”.

Recipients (SEG)
Source:

References

See also
List of geophysicists
 List of geophysics awards
List of prizes named after people

American Geophysical Union awards
Awards established in 1991
1991 establishments in the United States